Aylett may refer to:

Aylett (name), given name and surname
Aylett, Virginia, U.S., unincorporated community in King William County

See also